DEP domain-containing mTOR-interacting protein (DEPTOR) also known as DEP domain-containing protein 6 (DEPDC6) is a protein that in humans is encoded by the DEPTOR gene.

Structure 

The gene DEPTOR can be found only in vertebrates. In human, DEPTOR gene locates at chromosome 8, 8q24.12 with protein size 409 a.a. Human DEPTOR contains two N-terminal DEP domains and a C-terminal PDZ domain.

Function 

DEPTOR is involved in mTOR signaling pathway as an endogenous regulator. A direct interaction between DEPTOR and mTOR has been shown.  Overexpression of DEPTOR downregulates the activity of mTORC1 and mTORC2 in vitro. mTORC1 and mTORC2 can both inhibit DEPTOR through phosphorylation.

Metabolism 

DEPTOR cell-autonomously regulates adipogenesis. In the muscle, Baf60c promotes a switch from oxidative to glycolytic myofiber type through DEPTOR-mediated Akt/PKB activation. Within the brain, DEPTOR is highly expressed in the hippocampus, the medio-basal hypothalamus and the circumventricular organs. Overexpression of DEPTOR in the medio-basal hypothalamus protects mice against high-fat diet-induced obesity by modulating Akt/PKB signaling.

Clinical cancer 

Although in most cancer, mTOR pathway is constitutively activated and the expression of DEPTOR is low, one study has found that DEPTOR is overexpressed in multiple myeloma cells and is necessary for their survival.

References

Further reading